Vermont increased its apportionment from 2 seats to 4 after the 1800 census. Vermont law at the time required a majority of votes to win an office, which frequently necessitated additional ballots.

See also 
 United States House of Representatives elections, 1802 and 1803
 List of United States representatives from Vermont

Notes 

United States House of Representatives elections in Vermont
Vermont
United States House of Representatives
Vermont
United States House of Representatives